Nicola Mora (born 31 July 1979) is an Italian footballer who played as a defender.

Career
Mora started his career at hometown club Parma. After played 3 league matches, he joined Napoli of Serie B in temporary deal and was signed by another second division club Torino in co-ownership deal for 2.3 billion lire (€1.188 million). In June 2001 Parma bought back Mora for undisclosed fee and re-sold him to newly promoted Serie A club Piacenza of Serie A in another co-ownership for 2 billion lire (€1.033 million). The club also acquired half of Matuzalém for 6 billion lire from Napoli via Parma and half of Matteo Guardalben for 3 billion lire from Parma directly. Moreover, half of the registration rights of Giuseppe Cardone was signed from Parma in de facto and Vicenza retained another half. In June 2002, the transfer of Mora and Guardalben became permanent for undisclosed fee (with Matuzalém returned to Parma), but Mora joined Bari of Serie B in July. He was the regular but in 2004–05 season loaned to Napoli which newly relegated to Serie C1. After he returned to Bari, he failed to become a regular starter, and joined Pescara of Serie B in 6-month contract.

After the relegation of Pescara, in August 2007, he joined Foggia of Serie C1 in 1-year deal.

In June 2008, he returned to Serie B football after  seasons, joined Grosseto.

In November 2011 he was re-signed by Spezia.

Personal life
Mora is married to Flaminia and had a child; he is the brother-in-law of footballer Emanuele Calaiò, married to Flaminia's sister Federica. Mora and Calaiò both played for Torino in 2000–01 season and Napoli in 2004–05 season.

References

External links
Profile at Football.it 
Profile at FIGC 

Italian footballers
Italy under-21 international footballers
Parma Calcio 1913 players
Torino F.C. players
Piacenza Calcio 1919 players
S.S.C. Bari players
S.S.C. Napoli players
Delfino Pescara 1936 players
Calcio Foggia 1920 players
F.C. Grosseto S.S.D. players
Spezia Calcio players
Serie A players
Serie B players
Serie D players
Association football fullbacks
Sportspeople from Parma
1979 births
Living people
Footballers from Emilia-Romagna